"I've Been Thinking About You" is a song by British-American band Londonbeat, released as the lead single from their second studio album, In the Blood (1990). The song was produced by Martyn Phillips, and written by band members Jimmy Chambers, George Chandler, Jimmy Helms, and William Henshall. It became a major worldwide hit, reaching the number-one spot in more than 10 countries—including Australia, Canada, Germany and the United States—and peaking at number two on the UK Singles Chart.

Chart performance
"I've Been Thinking About You" was very successful on the charts all over the world, peaking at number one in at least eleven countries and remains the band's biggest hit. In Europe, the song peaked at the number-one position in Austria, Belgium, Finland, Germany, the Netherlands, Spain, Sweden and Switzerland, as well as on the Eurochart Hot 100. Additionally, it reached number two in Italy, Norway and the United Kingdom. In the latter, it peaked in its sixth week at the UK Singles Chart, on September 30, 1990. It was held off reaching the top spot by Maria McKee's "Show Me Heaven". The song was also a top 10 hit in Denmark, Greece and Ireland. Outside Europe, "I've Been Thinking About You" hit number-one also on both the Billboard Hot 100 and the Billboard Hot Dance Club Play chart in the United States, the RPM Top Singles chart in Canada, and in Australia, Israel and Zimbabwe. 

It was awarded with a gold record in Austria, Germany and the US, a silver record in the UK and a platinum record in Australia, the Netherlands and Sweden.

Critical reception
AllMusic editor Jim Smith described the song as "soulful dance", noting that Londonbeat's "pleasant harmonies and pumping flow are undeniably catchy." Another editor, Stephen Thomas Erlewine, called it "dazzling". David Taylor-Wilson from Bay Area Reporter declared it as "infectious", remarking that the band "blends Motownlike harmonies with dance grooves that incorporate ’70s funk rhythms". A reviewer from Billboard complimented its "tasty blend" an "an unshakable pop hook." Steve Morse from Boston Globe declared it as "a catchy soul-funk ditty" and "a deserved hit". Marisa Fox from Entertainment Weekly noted its "hypnotically catchy chorus, sweet harmonies, and slow, rollicking beat." Dave Sholin from the Gavin Report commented, "It's always a treat when a song comes along that I can't wait to review. Impossible not to detect a Fine Young Cannibals influence on this production that's been the biggest buzz record for the past couple of weeks." He added, "An international smash that's gone to #1 in no less than eleven countries, it's destined to win over audiences in the U.S.A., too. Top 40 radio is in dire need of more music like this!" 

Pan-European magazine Music & Media wrote, "C&W-tinged pop number underpins the band's characteristic massed gospel vocal style complete with jangling, melodic guitars and the sort of chorus which they patently lacked on their debut LP Speak. The first release from the forthcoming second LP In the Blood shows a definite maturity." David Giles from Music Week found that the band have "taken note of dancefloor developments and ditched the go go based rhythms of old for a deep-rooted funkiness and R&B influenced vocal." Holden, Stephen from New York Times wrote, "Londonbeat is a textbook example of a group that recombines familiar pop-soul sounds in a personal and engaging way. Its single [...] blends the light, machine-driven rhythms of Soul II Soul with the post-Motown vocal style of Fine Young Cannibals." Parry Gettelman from Orlando Sentinel noted that "its dance groove is blended with lush, postmodern R&B played on both synthesized and gen-u-ine instruments." Ian Cranna from Smash Hits said the rhythm is "straight out of the Stock, Aitken & Watermans book of bounciness." Bob Mack from Spin felt it "is too damn catchy."

Impact and legacy
"I've Been Thinking About You" was awarded one of BMI's Pop Awards in the category for Million Performance Songs in 1993, honoring the songwriters, composers and music publishers of the song.

Australian music channel Max included the song in their list of "1000 Greatest Songs of All Time" in 2013.

American magazine Billboard placed "I've Been Thinking About You" at number 158 in their ranking of "Billboards Top Songs of the '90s" in 2019.

Track listing and formats

 7" single
 "I've Been Thinking About You" – 3:49
 "9 A.M." (live at Moles) – 5:49

 CD maxi
 "I've Been Thinking About You" (7" version) – 3:49
 "I've Been Thinking About You" (c'est wot mix) – 5:38
 "9AM" (live at Moles) – 5:49

 CD maxi – US
 "I've Been Thinking About You" (def 12" mix) – 6:50
 "I've Been Thinking About You" (red zone mix) – 4:42
 "I've Been Thinking About You" (reprise) – 1:33
 "I've Been Thinking About You" (vocal dub) – 5:50
 "I've Been Thinking About You" (the eclipse mix) – 4:12
 "I've Been Thinking About You" (trak mix) – 3:05

 CD single
 "I've Been Thinking About You" – 3:49
 "9AM" (live at Moles) – 5:49

 12" maxi
 "I've Been Thinking About You" (c'est wot mix)
 "I've Been Thinking About You" (force feel dub mix)
 "I've Been Thinking About You" (7" version)

 12" maxi
 "I've Been Thinking About You" (extended club mix)
 "I've Been Thinking About You" (radio edit)
 "I've Been Thinking About You" (instrumental)
 "I've Been Thinking About You" (dub)

 Cassette
 "I've Been Thinking About You" (def 12" mix) – 6:50
 "I've Been Thinking About You" (red zone mix) – 4:42
 "I've Been Thinking About You" (reprise) – 1:33
 "I've Been Thinking About You" (vocal dub) – 5:50
 "I've Been Thinking About You" (the eclipse mix) – 4:12
 "I've Been Thinking About You" (trak mix) – 3:05

Charts and certifications

Weekly charts

Year-end charts

Decade-end charts

Certifications

Other versions
 In 2019, German DJ/producer, Klaas remixed a version of the song featuring newly recorded vocals from Londonbeat.

See also
List of European number-one airplay songs of the 1990s

References

External links
 Londonbeat Official Website
 Facebook Page

1990 singles
1990 songs
Dance-pop songs
Billboard Hot 100 number-one singles
Cashbox number-one singles
Dutch Top 40 number-one singles
European Hot 100 Singles number-one singles
House music songs
Londonbeat songs
Number-one singles in Australia
Number-one singles in Austria
Number-one singles in Belgium
Number-one singles in Finland
Number-one singles in Germany
Number-one singles in Israel
Number-one singles in Spain
Number-one singles in Sweden
Number-one singles in Switzerland
Number-one singles in Zimbabwe
Radioactive Records singles
RPM Top Singles number-one singles